The 2019 Food City 500 is a Monster Energy NASCAR Cup Series race held on April 7, 2019, at Bristol Motor Speedway in Bristol, Tennessee. Contested over 500 laps on the  concrete short track, it was the eighth race of the 2019 Monster Energy NASCAR Cup Series season.

Report

Background

Bristol Motor Speedway, formerly known as Bristol International Raceway and Bristol Raceway, is a NASCAR short track venue located in Bristol, Tennessee. Constructed in 1960, it held its first NASCAR race on July 30, 1961. Despite its short length, Bristol is among the most popular tracks on the NASCAR schedule because of its distinct features, which include extraordinarily steep banking, an all concrete surface, two pit roads, and stadium-like seating.

Entry list

First practice

Qualifying

Qualifying results

Practice (post-qualifying)

Second practice

Final practice

Race

Stage results

Stage One
Laps: 125

Stage Two
Laps: 125

Final stage results

Stage Three
Laps: 250

Race statistics
 Lead changes: 21 among 9 different drivers
 Cautions/Laps: 11 for 77
 Red flags: 0
 Time of race: 2 hours, 56 minutes and 38 seconds
 Average speed:

Media

Television
Fox Sports covered their 19th race at the Bristol Motor Speedway. Mike Joy, five-time Bristol winner Jeff Gordon and 12-time Bristol winner – and all-time Bristol race winner – Darrell Waltrip had the call in the booth for the race. Jamie Little, Regan Smith, Vince Welch and Matt Yocum handled the pit road duties for the television side.

Radio
PRN had the radio call for the race which was also be simulcasted on Sirius XM NASCAR Radio. Doug Rice, Mark Garrow and Wendy Venturini called the race in the booth when the field was racing down the frontstretch. Rob Albright called the race from atop the turn 3 suites when the field raced down the backstretch. Brad Gillie, Brett Mcmillan, Jim Noble, and Steve Richards covered the action on pit lane.

Standings after the race

Drivers' Championship standings

Manufacturers' Championship standings

Note: Only the first 16 positions are included for the driver standings.
. – Driver has clinched a position in the Monster Energy NASCAR Cup Series playoffs.

References

Food City 500
Food City 500
Food City 500
NASCAR races at Bristol Motor Speedway